Niagara Glen Nature Reserve is a nature reserve located near the Niagara Whirlpool along the Canadian side of the Niagara Gorge.  It is one of the best preserved remaining example of Southern Ontario's original Carolinian forest.  The park is operated by the Niagara Parks Commission, an agency of the Ontario government. The park features overlooks of the whirlpool and gorge as well as several hiking trails through the Carolinian forest.  The nature reserve protects a pristine area of the Niagara Escarpment.  The nature reserve is open to the public daily, as long as weather permits.

Rock Climbing
The glen is a prominent rock climbing area in Southern Ontario, being home to a large concentration of limestone boulders.  In 2011, a Bouldering permit system was developed jointly by the Niagara Parks Commission and the Ontario Alliance of Climbers to preserve climbing access, manage a significant growth in climbers and preserve sensitive vegetation adjacent to climbing areas.

References

Nature reserves in Ontario
Niagara River
Temperate broadleaf and mixed forests in Canada
Conservation areas in Ontario
Protected areas of the Regional Municipality of Niagara
Forests of Ontario
Niagara Parks Commission